Diploplectron is a genus of wasps in the family Crabronidae. There are more than 20 described species in Diploplectron.

Species
These 22 species belong to the genus Diploplectron:

 Diploplectron alexandri Kazenas, 1996
 Diploplectron asiaticum Pulawski, 1965
 Diploplectron beccum F. Parker, 1972
 Diploplectron bidentatiformis Rohwer
 Diploplectron brunneipes (Cresson, 1881)
 Diploplectron californicum F. Parker, 1972
 Diploplectron diablense F. Williams, 1951
 Diploplectron ferrugineum Ashmead, 1899
 Diploplectron florissantensis Rohwer
 Diploplectron fossor Rohwer, 1909
 Diploplectron irwini F. Parker, 1972
 Diploplectron kantsi Pate, 1941
 Diploplectron kriegeri Brauns, 1899
 Diploplectron neotropicum F. Parker, 1972
 Diploplectron orizabense F. Parker, 1972
 Diploplectron palearcticum Pulawski, 1958
 Diploplectron peglowi Krombein, 1939
 Diploplectron pulawskii Kazenas, 1975
 Diploplectron reticulatum F. Williams, 1946
 Diploplectron secoense F. Parker, 1972
 Diploplectron sierrense F. Parker, 1972
 Diploplectron vierecki Pate, 1941

References

Crabronidae
Articles created by Qbugbot